The 1998 South Lakeland District Council election took place on 7 May 1998 to elect members of South Lakeland District Council in Cumbria, England. One third of the council was up for election and the council stayed under no overall control.

After the election, the composition of the council was:
Liberal Democrat 20
Conservative 13
Labour 10
Independent 9

Election result

References

1998
1998 English local elections
1990s in Cumbria